Francisco Eduardo Venegas Moreno (born 16 July 1998), is a Mexican professional footballer who plays as a defender for Liga MX club Mazatlán.

International career

Youth
Venegas was called up for the 2017 FIFA U-20 World Cup.

Venegas was called up by Jaime Lozano to participate with the under-23 team at the 2019 Pan American Games, with Mexico winning the third-place match.

Senior
Venegas made his senior national team debut under manager Gerardo Martino on 2 October 2019 in a friendly against Trinidad & Tobago. He substituted Sebastián Córdova in the 74th minute.

Career statistics

Club

International

Honours
Tigres UANL
Liga MX: Clausura 2019
CONCACAF Champions League: 2020

Mexico Youth
CONCACAF U-17 Championship: 2015
Pan American Bronze Medal: 2019

References

External links

1998 births
Living people
Mexican expatriate footballers
Mexican footballers
Mexico under-20 international footballers
Mexico international footballers
Association football defenders
C.F. Pachuca players
Everton de Viña del Mar footballers
Tigres UANL footballers
Chilean Primera División players
Expatriate footballers in Chile
Mexican expatriate sportspeople in Chile
Footballers from Guanajuato
Liga MX players
Tercera División de México players
Pan American Games medalists in football
Pan American Games bronze medalists for Mexico
Footballers at the 2019 Pan American Games
Medalists at the 2019 Pan American Games